Rodney Lee "Rod" Freeman (born November 5, 1950) is a retired professional basketball small forward who played one season in the National Basketball Association (NBA) as a member of the Philadelphia 76ers during the 1973–74 season. He attended Vanderbilt University and in the 11th round of the 1973 NBA draft he was selected by the 76ers.

External links

1950 births
Living people
Basketball players from Indiana
Philadelphia 76ers draft picks
Philadelphia 76ers players
Small forwards
Sportspeople from Anderson, Indiana
Vanderbilt Commodores men's basketball players
American men's basketball players